Daykin is a surname. Notable people with the surname include:

 Bert Daykin, Australian rules footballer
 Christopher Daykin, British actuary
 Percy Daykin, Australian rules footballer
 Richard Daykin, Australian rules footballer
 Thomas Daykin, English footballer
 Tony Daykin, American football player
 Aaron Daykin, Aircraft Engineer

See also
 Daykin, Nebraska, a village in Jefferson County
 Ahlswede–Daykin inequality, an inequality in statistical mechanics
 Alexander and Daykin, Millette Alexander and Frank Daykin, an American piano duo